Daniel Barton Oerther (born October 11, 1972) is an American professor. He is best known for leadership bridging engineering and nursing to advance environmental health practice through science diplomacy. Oerther uses 16S ribosomal RNA-targeted techniques for fundamental studies of the ecology of bacteria in engineered and natural systems. He promotes transdisciplinarity among engineers, nurses, and sanitarians to improve access to clean water, nutritious food, and energy efficiency in developing communities. Oerther practices innovation in the scholarship of teaching and learning, including modified mastery learning.

Life and education 
Born in Columbus, OH, Oerther grew up in Louisville, KY, and graduated from Saint Xavier High School.  He earned a Baccalaureate of Arts (BA) in Biological Sciences (1995) and a Baccalaureate of Sciences (BS) in Environmental Engineering (1995) from Northwestern University. He earned a Masters of Science (MS) in Environmental Engineering (1998) and a Doctorate of Philosophy (PhD) (2002) from the University of Illinois.  He completed post-doctoral training in microbial ecology at the Marine Biological Laboratory, environmental health at the University of Cincinnati, public health at Johns Hopkins University, and public administration at Indiana University.

Employment

University of Cincinnati 
Oerther served as Head of the Department of Civil and Environmental Engineering at the University of Cincinnati  He created a campus-wide minor in sustainability and founded a student chapter of Engineers Without Borders. Nancy L. Zimpher recognized Oerther with the President's Excellence Award in 2007.

Missouri University of Science and Technology 
In 2010, Oerther joined the faculty of the Missouri University of Science and Technology as the John A. and Susan Mathes Endowed Chair of Environmental Engineering. He promoted the Solar Village, and established the Diplomacy Lab program on campus. Mun Choi recognized Oerther with the President's Award for Cross-Cultural Engagement in 2017 and the University of Missouri System's C. Brice Ratchford Fellowship in 2019 for advancing the institution's land grant mission

United States Department of State 

From 2014 to 2019, Oerther was a Foreign Affairs Officer at the United States Department of State in the Secretary's Office of Global Food Security.  He represented the United States at the Second International Conference on Nutrition, the launch of the Blue Growth Network in St. George's, Grenada, the second Our Ocean Conference in Valparaiso, Chile, and the 43rd plenary session of the Committee on World Food Security in Rome, Italy. Ambassador Nancy Stetson recognized Oerther with a Meritorious Honor Award for his efforts to create COAST. Oerther's additional recognitions from the State Department include the 2005 Fulbright-Nehru Scholar to the Indian Institute of Science, India, the 2012 Fulbright-ALCOA Distinguished Chair to the Federal University of Western Para, Brazil, and the 2019 Fulbright Scholar to King's College London, UK.

American Academy of Environmental Engineers and Scientists 

In 2013, Oerther was elected Treasurer of the American Academy of Environmental Engineers and Scientists. He served as President in 2022, and he currently serves as Executive Director. His awards from the Academy include the 2016 Superior Achievement Award for, "Improved water quality in Ixcan, Guatemala." Throughout 2020, Oerther served as the Academy's Kappe Distinguished Lecturer.

Appointments

Chartered Institute of Environmental Health 
In 2020, Oerther joined the Board of Trustees of the Chartered Institute of Environmental Health,and he currently serves as Chair of the Board - the first person from outside the United Kingdom to hold this position.

Engineers Without Borders USA 
In 2020, Oerther was appointed to the Board of Directors of Engineers Without Borders – USA. In 2022, he was elected Treasurer.

Missouri Hazardous Waste Management Commission 
In 2020, Oerther was appointed to the Missouri Hazardous Waste Management Commission by Governor Mike Parson (R). In 2022, he was elected Chair of the Commission.

Fellowships 
In the United States, Oerther is a Fellow of the American Academy of Nursing (2016), the Academy of Nursing Education of the National League for Nursing (2018), and the Association of Environmental Engineering and Science Professors (2020).

In the United Kingdom, Oerther is a Fellow of the Royal Society of Arts (2017), the Royal Society for Public Health (2017), the Society of Environmental Engineers (2018), the Chartered Institute of Environmental Health (2018), and the Society of Operations Engineers (2020).

Additional appointments 
Oerther is an Associate Editor of the Journal of Environmental Engineering, published by the American Society of Civil Engineers. Previously he was an Associate Editor of the journal, Water Environment Research, published by the Water Environment Federation, and a member of the International Advisory Board of the journal, Perspectives in Public Health, published by the Royal Society for Public Health.

Oerther is a Visiting Professor at the Institute of Science and Technology for Advanced Studies and Research, Gujarat, India; an adjunct professor in the School of Life Sciences, Manipal University in Karnataka, India; a Faculty Consultant at Future University in Egypt. He was previously an adjunct professor at UFOPA and a visiting scholar at King's College London.

Oerther was a member of the Board of Directors and the Chief Information Officer of the Association of Environmental Engineering and Science Professors (2007-2010).

From 2013 to 2021, Oerther was a member of the Board of Directors of the Sigma Theta Tau International Building Corporation. He served as Treasurer from 2019 to 2021.

Selected work 
Oerther co-led studies to address food deserts in urban Cincinnati, and rural Missouri. And he has worked to eliminate childhood stunting in Brazil, Guatemala, and South Africa through the Global Research on WaSH - water, sanitation, and hygiene - to Eliminate childhood Stunting (GRoWES) project.

Oerther helped to design, finance, construct, and equip community health clinics in Tanzania and Ghana.

Oerther helped bring clean drinking water and community latrines to villages in Kenya, Tanzania, and India.

Oerther co-founded PulaCloud, LLC to bring entry-level jobs in human computation supporting the knowledge-economy to Kenya and to rural Missouri.

Oerther and his family demonstrated small-home living in Missouri.

Oerther helped to design and launch a parametric insurance product, which aims to formalize the artisanal fishing sector throughout the Caribbean as a way of improving governance and sustainable management of catch fisheries via COAST - the Caribbean Ocean and Aquaculture Sustainability faciliTy.

Scholarly activities

Environmental biotechnology 
Oerther is part of a team of faculty working in the field of environmental biotechnology – where 16S ribosomal RNA-targeted techniques and microbial genomics are used to advance the  understanding of ecology in engineered and natural systems used by environmental engineers and scientists to treat water, soils, and gases. His contributions have included:

 development of methods to identify the origin of microbiological contamination from fecal wastes discharged to watersheds.
 recommendations to improve the performance of suspended growth, aerobic, municipal sewage treatment systems perturbed by discharges of industrial pollutants;
 recommendations to reduce the early stages of membrane biofouling in aerobic, submerged membrane bioreactors;

Interprofessional environmental health 
Oerther works with teams of engineers, nurses, and other health care professionals to work alongside developing communities around the world as part of community-based participatory research (CBPR). His contributions have included:

 fundamental studies on the environmental determinants of childhood stunting including the interaction of microbial contamination of drinking water and aflatoxin contamination of maize.
 the adaptation of structural equation modeling to evaluate causes of diarrhea illness in rural Guatemala, rural Brazil, and South Africa;
 Demonstration of the use of sovereign parametric insurance to support food and nutrition security for artisanal and small-scale fisherfolk;

Scholarship of teaching and learning 
 the creation and dissemination of a novel course teaching molecular biology skills to engineers through hands-on laboratory activities without prerequisite knowledge of biology;
 recommendations for adapting mastery learning from nursing for use in the field of environmental engineering;
 development of courses teaching: science diplomacy; environmental health; and environmental modeling.

Awards 

Oerther's awards include:

 2003, CAREER Award, National Science Foundation
 2004, Outstanding Contribution to Environmental Engineering and Science Education Award from the Association of Environmental Engineering and Science Professors
 2005, invited participant, "National Academies Keck Futures Initiative: The Genomics Revolution: Implication for Treatment and Control of Infectious Disease"
 2011, invited participant, "National Academies Frontiers of Engineering Education"
 2015, Steven K. Dentel/AEESP Award for Global Outreach
 2015, invited participant, "National Academies Keck Futures Initiative: Art, Design and Science, Engineering and Medicine Frontier Collaborations Ideation, Translation, Realization"
 2017, Frederick George Pohland Medal for bridging environmental engineering research, education, and practice, from the Environmental Engineering and Science Foundation, AEESP, AAEES, and the Pohland family
 2018, Dr. John L. Leal Award for distinguished service to the water profession, from the American Water Works Association
 2018, Best Innovative Environmental Health Solution Award from the Chartered Institute of Environmental Health
 2019, Engineering Education Excellence Award for demonstrated ability to link engineering education with professional practice, from the National Society of Professional Engineers
 2019, Robert G. Quinn Award for outstanding contributions in providing and promoting excellence in experimentation and laboratory instruction, from the American Society for Engineering Education
 2019, Lillian Wald Humanitarian Award for improving lives of those in need through selfless, courageous, creative and compassionate acts, from the National League for Nursing
 2020, Gordon Maskew Fair Distinguished Engineering Educator Medal for research and the education and development of future engineers, from the Water Environment Federation

Bibliography 

Oerther has more than 130 publications listed on Scopus. These publications have been cited more than 2,500 times, and Oerther has an h-index of more than 20. Examples of his most-cited articles include:
<li>
<li>
<li>

References

External links 

Google Scholar
Wikimedia Commons
Daniel Oerther profile on Arabic language version of Wikipedia

American bioengineers
Environmental engineers
Environmental health practitioners
Social entrepreneurs
American humanitarians
Design educators
1972 births
Living people
Northwestern University alumni
University of Illinois alumni
Johns Hopkins University alumni
Indiana University alumni
University of Cincinnati faculty
Missouri University of Science and Technology faculty
United States Department of State officials
Fulbright Distinguished Chairs
Jefferson Science Fellows
Fellows of the American Academy of Nursing
Fellows of the Academy of Nursing Education
Fellows of the Royal Society for Public Health
Fellows of the Chartered Institute of Environmental Health
Fellows of the Society of Environmental Engineers
Fellows of the Association of Environmental Engineering and Science Professors
Fulbright alumni